= Prayerbox =

Prayerbox was a religious social networking website that allows users share prayer points and testimonies with their friends and people from around the world. It launched December 10, 2014.

It worked like Twitter but for religion. Users could create accounts and post prayer requests which were then seen by the people in their network and other users of the website. In place of a retweet or like button, users could say amen to prayers. When prayers were answered, a user had the ability to post a testimony which was then seen by people who interacted with the particular prayer. The website grown considerably at its early stage of launch and had over 100,000 active users. Churches were also allowed to create pages through which they could connect with their congregation.

Beyond sharing prayers and testimonies, Prayerbox also allowed users pay tithes, offerings or donations directly to their churches through a secure payment channel.

The idea was founded by Nigerian programmer Adebambo Oyekan Oyelaja and funded by 440.ng, a startup accelerator based in Lagos, Nigeria. The founder said it closed down due to inadequate business strategy.

== Links ==
- Prayerbox - official site
- http://www.cp-africa.com/2015/04/21/meet-oyelaja-oyekan-the-entrepreneur-behind-prayerbox-a-new-app-aiming-to-be-the-twitter-for-religion/
- http://disrupt-africa.com/2014/12/nigerian-startup-prayerbox-twitter-religion/
- https://web.archive.org/web/20150726205444/http://www.humanipo.com/news/47525/ourprayerbox-com-allows-christians-to-share-prayer-points-testimonies/
- http://www.aleteia.org/it/tecnologia/articolo/cosa-essere-prayerbox-5824453036474368
- http://www.repubblica.it/tecnologia/social-network/2015/05/13/news/twitter_religione-114254879/
- http://techcabal.com/2015/03/24/adebambo-oyelaja-i-learnt-to-code-because-i-love-building-things/
- http://pulse.ng/tech/religious-technology-prayerbox-co-founder-ceo-speaks-with-pulse-tv-id3695951.html
- http://pulse.ng/tech/prayerbox-young-nigerian-techpreneur-interviewed-by-forbes-id3741626.html
- http://www.geektime.com/2014/12/16/nigerias-prayerbox-co-is-a-social-network-that-caters-to-devout-christians/
- http://ventureburn.com/2015/03/social-media-religion-startup-prayerbox-connects-nigerians-churches-online/
- http://connectnigeria.com/articles/2015/01/20/meet-the-boss-oyelaja-oyekan-prayerbox/
- http://innovation-village.com/nigerias-religious-startup-prayerbox-co-records-over-42000-users/
- http://yngvns.com/web-design/gods-twitter-prayerbox-co-fuses-religion-and-social-media/
- http://techmoran.com/prayerbox-co-wants-africas-twitter-god-fearing/#sthash.Vg1w9yw2.dpbs
- http://techpoint.ng/inside-the-business-of-prayerbox-with-bambo-oyelaja/
- http://africansmakingmoney.com/adebambo-oyelaja-prayerbox/
- http://www.osservatoreromano.va/en/news/connecting-nigerias-faithful
